The 2016 Copa Libertadores de América (officially the 2016 Copa Bridgestone Libertadores for sponsorship reasons) was the 57th edition of the Copa Libertadores de América, South America's premier club football tournament organized by CONMEBOL.

In the finals, Colombian club Atlético Nacional defeated Ecuadorian club Independiente del Valle by an aggregate score of 2–1 to win their second tournament title in team history and qualify for the 2016 FIFA Club World Cup in Japan, their first appearance in the FIFA Club World Cup. They also earned the right to play against the winners of the 2016 Copa Sudamericana in the 2017 Recopa Sudamericana. They also automatically qualified for the 2017 Copa Libertadores group stage.

River Plate were the defending champions, but were eliminated by Independiente del Valle in the round of 16.

Teams
The following 38 teams from 11 associations (the 10 CONMEBOL members plus Mexico which were invited to compete) qualified for the tournament:
Title holders
Argentina and Brazil: 5 berths each
All other associations: 3 berths each

The entry stage is determined as follows:
Second stage: 26 teams (top four teams from Argentina and Brazil, and top two teams from all other associations)
First stage: 12 teams (team with the lowest berth from each association, plus team with the second lowest berth from association of title holders)

Draw

The draw of the tournament was held on 22 December 2015, 20:30 PYST (UTC−3), at the CONMEBOL Convention Centre in Luque, Paraguay.

Starting from this season, teams were seeded by the newly established CONMEBOL ranking of the Copa Libertadores (except for teams from Mexico which were not ranked and thus seeded last in all draws), taking into account of the following three factors:
Performance in the last 10 years, taking into account Copa Libertadores results in the period 2006–2015
Historical coefficient, taking into account Copa Libertadores results in the period 1960–2005
Local tournament champion, with bonus points awarded to domestic league champions of the last 10 years

Schedule
The schedule of the competition is as follows (all dates listed are Wednesdays, but matches may be played on Tuesdays and Thursdays as well). There is a one-month break between the quarterfinals and semifinals due to the Copa América Centenario held in June.

Notes

First stage

Second stage

Group 1

Group 2

Group 3

Group 4

Group 5

Group 6

Group 7

Group 8

Final stages

Seeding

Bracket

Round of 16

Quarterfinals

Semifinals

Finals

Statistics

Top goalscorers

Top assists

Prize money dispute
In January 2016, several clubs threatened to withdraw from the competition due a disagreement regarding prize money. CONMEBOL had offered a 40% increase on what was given in the 2015 edition but clubs wanted a 150% increase. On 2 February, CONMEBOL announced that the prize money paid to each club was doubled from the previous amount.

See also
2016 FIFA Club World Cup
2016 Copa Sudamericana
2017 Recopa Sudamericana

References

External links
 
Copa Libertadores 2016, CONMEBOL.com 

 
2016
1